Cardington Township is one of the sixteen townships of Morrow County, Ohio, United States.  The 2010 census found 3,095 people in the township, 2,047 of whom lived in the village of Cardington.

Geography
Located in the western part of the county, it borders the following townships:
Canaan Township - north
Gilead Township - northeast
Lincoln Township - southeast
Westfield Township - southwest
Richland Township, Marion County - west
Claridon Township, Marion County - northwest corner

Most of the village of Cardington is located in southeastern Cardington Township.

Name and history
Cardington Township took its name from the village of Cardington. It is the only Cardington Township statewide.

Government
The township is governed by a three-member board of trustees, who are elected in November of odd-numbered years to a four-year term beginning on the following January 1. Two are elected in the year after the presidential election and one is elected in the year before it. There is also an elected township fiscal officer, who serves a four-year term beginning on April 1 of the year after the election, which is held in November of the year before the presidential election. Vacancies in the fiscal officership or on the board of trustees are filled by the remaining trustees.

References

External links
County website

Townships in Morrow County, Ohio
Townships in Ohio